Zac Derr  is a former American football placekicker in the National Football League, having played for the Dallas Cowboys, Detroit Lions, and Atlanta Falcons.

He was signed by the Falcons May 12, 2006, in an open competition against Seth Marler, Ryan Rossner, and Tony Yelk. He was waived on July 30 after suffering a torn groin injury, with both sides reaching an injury settlement the next day.

After this, Zac attended Seminary and became a pastor.  He is currently preaching at The Chapel in Wadsworth, Ohio.

References

Year of birth missing (living people)
Living people
American football placekickers
Akron Zips football players
Dallas Cowboys players
Detroit Lions players
Atlanta Falcons players